The , officially the , is a Japanese funicular line on Mount Tsukuba, Tsukuba, Ibaraki. It is the only funicular line  operates, while it also operates an aerial tramway (Mount Tsukuba Ropeway), hotels and restaurants. The company belongs to Keisei Group.

The line was built in 1925, is the second oldest cable car line in the Kanto region, and the fifth oldest in Japan.

Basic data
Built: 1925
Distance: 
Gauge: 
Stations: 2
Vertical interval: 
Speed: 
Trip Time: 8 minutes

See also

List of funicular railways
List of railway companies in Japan
List of railway lines in Japan
Mount Tsukuba Ropeway

References

External links 
 Tsukubasan Cable Car & Ropeway official website 
 Mt Tsukuba Cable Car & Ropeway official website  (in English)

Funicular railways in Japan
Rail transport in Ibaraki Prefecture
1067 mm gauge railways in Japan